{{Infobox theologian
| name               = James F. Linzey
| image              = Air Force Captain James F Linzey November 5 1989.jpg
| alt                =
| caption            = Former Air Force Space Command Captain James F Linzey, (Ret.), November 5, 1989, Author of the US Space Force Hymn (Creator of the Universe)
| birth_date         = 
| birth_place        = San Diego, California
| occupation         = Former Air Force Captain, Bible scholar, author, public speaker, movie actor, songwriter, minister
| period             = 1985–present 
| tradition_movement = Southern Baptist Convention
| main_interests     = Military, Biblical Theology, Bible Translation, Leadership
| notable_works      = Modern English Version, New Tyndale Version New Testament, The Military Bible: The Seven Principles of Leadership, Creator of the Universe (The United States Space Force Hymn)
| spouse             =
| children           =
}}

James F. Linzey, M.Div. (born September 26, 1958) is an ordained minister in the Southern Baptist Convention and the author of numerous Bibles and books. The chief editor and executive director of the Modern English Version Bible,  and the general editor of the New Tyndale Version, he is the author of The United States Space Force Hymn (Creator of the Universe).

His degrees include a B.A. from Southern California College and an M.Div. from Fuller Theological Seminary; also, he attended the Billy Graham School of Evangelism in Asheville, North Carolina.

 Books 

A prolific Bible translator and writer, Linzey authored and edited numerous Bibles and books:Modern English Version (MEV) Bible (author/chief editor), 2014. Passio.
"Acts of the Apostles:" Modern English Version (translated with Michael Pacella, III), 2014. Passio.New Tyndale Version New Testament (general editor and chairman, translation committee), 2013. Military Bible Association.The Leadership Bible: The Seven Principles of Leadership (chairman, editorial committee), 2013. Military Bible Association.Baptism in the Spirit (co-ed. with Verna Linzey), 2012. Military Bible Association. The Holy Spirit, 2003. Xulon Press. A Divine Appointment in Washington, D.C., 1999. Huntington House Publishers. 
"The Ten Commandments As the Root of American Culture:" Why the Conservative Mind Matters'', 2009. Higher Standard Publishers.

References 

1958 births
Living people
Fuller Theological Seminary alumni
People from San Diego
20th-century American writers
21st-century American writers
Translators of the Bible into English
United States Army chaplains
Military personnel from California